Scelilasia is a genus of moths in the subfamily Arctiinae. It contains the single species Scelilasia erythrozonata, which is found in Panama and Costa Rica.

References

Arctiinae